L'Alpe d'Huez is a ski resort in southeastern France at . It is a mountain pasture in the Central French Western Alps, in the commune of Huez, which is part of the department of Isère in the region of Auvergne-Rhône-Alpes.

Alpe d'Huez is known internationally as an iconic cycling venue, as it is used regularly in the Tour de France cycle race, including twice on the same day in 2013. In 2019, it became the site of the first Tomorrowland Winter festival.

History
The site of the Alpe has been permanently occupied since the Middle Ages. East of L'Alpe veti, a medieval agglomeration had grown from the end of the 11th to the 14th century under the name of Brandes. It was composed of a castle, a parish church with a cemetery, a village with about 80 homes, surface and underground mine workings, as well as several industrial districts. Its occupants operated a silver mine on behalf of the Dauphin. It is currently the only medieval  known and preserved in its entirety, making it a unique site in Europe and classified as historical monuments by a decree of 6 August 1995.

Excavated and studied continuously since 1977 by a team of the CNRS, this site is registered as an historic monument. The medieval mining operation stretched from Gua (the  Valley) to the Lac Blanc [White Lake] (Massif des Rousses). The massif was also the subject of mining operations, including copper, from the Bronze Age.

It is also at Alpe d'Huez where botanist Gaston Bonnier began his study of flora of France in 1871.

The station was developed from the 1920s.

Economy
Each year, the Alpe d'Huez Film Festival is held in January.

Alpe d'Huez also has an altiport, the Alpe d'Huez Airport, built for the 10th Winter Olympics held at Grenoble in 1968. The altiport hosts helicopters including those of civil security, SAF Helicopteres and the Dauphiné flying club. A gourmet restaurant is located on the edge of the platform.

Local culture and heritage

Sites and monuments

The church

Alpe d'Huez has a modern and original church, the appearance of which recalls a silhouette of the Virgin Mary. Under the leadership of Father Jaap Reuten, head of the parish from 1964 to 1992, it was designed by the architect Jean Marol in the 1960s (completed in 1970), and decorated with colour-rich stained-glass windows by the artist Arcabas.

This church houses a pipe organ which is unique in the world. The organ takes the form of a hand drawn up towards the sky, designed by composer Jean Guillou and the German organ builder Detlef Kleuker. Each year, concerts are held around this instrument on Thursday night, winter and summer, as well as organ, pan flute and choral courses during the summer.

Cultural heritage

Winter sports
Alpe d'Huez is primarily used for downhill, or Alpine skiing.

Skiing at Alpe d'Huez

Alpe d'Huez is one of Europe's premier skiing venues. The site of the Pomagalski's first surface lift in the mid thirties, the resort gained popularity when it hosted the bobsleigh events of the 1968 Winter Olympics. At that time the resort was seen as a competitor to Courchevel as France's most upmarket purpose built resort but the development of Les Trois Vallées, Val d'Isère, Tignes, La Plagne and Les Arcs saw Alpe D'Huez fall from favour in the 1970s and early 1980s.

With  of piste and 84 ski lifts, the resort is now one of the world's largest. Extensive snowmaking facilities helped combat the ski area's largely south-facing orientation and helped Alpe d'Huez appeal to beginner skiers, with very easy slopes. The expansion of the skiing above the linked resorts of Vaujany, Oz-en-Oisans, Villard Reculas and Auris boosted the quantity and quality of intermediate grade slopes but the resort is mostly known for freeskiing, drawing many steep skiing enthusiasts to its high altitude terrain.

These include the 50-degree Cheminees du Mascle couloirs, the open powder field of Le Grand Sablat, the Couloir Fleur and the Perrins bowl. The proximity to the exclusively off-piste resort of La Grave as well as tree skiing at Serre Chevalier and the glacier and terrain parks of Les Deux Alpes have made Alpe d'Huez a popular base for skiers looking to explore the Oisans region.

1968 Winter Olympics
The track, built in spring 1966 for FRF 5.5 million, hosted the World Championships in 1967. The cooling could not keep the ice solid in bright daylight – not least because the track faced south. The four-man event was cancelled because of thawing ice, and modifications were made that spring to prepare for the Games. The refrigeration system was strengthened in turns 6, 9, 12, and 13; turn 12 was covered with stone and earthwork to prevent concrete coming up, turn 12 was cooled with liquid nitrogen, and shades were built on turns 6, 9, 12, and 13 to minimise direct sunlight. Thawing remained a problem and Olympic bobsleigh events had to be scheduled before sunrise. The track closed in 1972 due to high operating costs; the structure remains as demolition was not economical.

{| class=wikitable style="text-align:center"
|+ Physical statistics
! Sport
! Length
! Turns
! Vertical drop
! Average grade (%)
|-
|Bobsleigh
|
|13
|
|9.33
|}
No turn names were given for the track.

Cycle racing

Details
The climb to the summit starts at Le Bourg d'Oisans in the Romanche valley. Despite its notoriety, Alpe d'Huez is only the 56th hardest bike climb in France.

Tour de France
L'Alpe d'Huez is climbed regularly in the Tour de France. It was first included in the race in 1952 and has been a stage finish regularly since 1976. The race was brought to the mountain by Élie Wermelinger, the chief commissaire or referee. He drove his Panhard Dyna car between snow banks that lined the road in March 1952, invited by a consortium of businesses who had opened hotels at the summit. Their leader was Georges Rajon, who ran the Hotel Christina. The ski station there opened in 1936. Wermelinger reported to the organiser, Jacques Goddet, and the Tour signed a contract with the businessmen to include the Alpe. It cost them the modern equivalent of €3,250.

That first Alpe d'Huez stage was won in 1952 by Fausto Coppi. Coppi attacked  from the summit to rid himself of the French rider Jean Robic. This was the year that motorcycle television crews first came to the Tour. It was also the Tour's first mountain-top finish. The veteran reporter, Jacques Augendre, said:

"The Tourmalet, the Galibier and the Izoard were the mythical mountains of the race. These three cols were supplanted by the Alpe d'Huez. Why? Because it's the col of modernity. Coppi's victory in 1952 was the symbol of a golden age of cycling, that of champions [such as] Coppi, Bartali, Kubler, Koblet, Bobet. But only Coppi and Armstrong and Carlos Sastre have been able to take the maillot jaune on the Alpe and to keep it to Paris. That's not by chance. From the first edition, shown on live television, the Alpe d'Huez definitively transformed the way the Grande Boucle ran. No other stage has had such drama. With its 21 bends, its gradient and the number of spectators, it is a climb in the style of Hollywood."

Augendre omitted Laurent Fignon, who, along with Coppi and Armstrong, took yellow on the Alpe without winning the stage in 1983, 1984, and 1989. He held it into Paris in 1983 and 1984 but in 1989 he lost it on the final stage to Paris, a time trial, to Greg LeMond to finish second by 8", the closest finish in tour history.

After Coppi's win, the Alpe was dropped until 1964, when it was included as a mid-stage climb, and then again until 1976, both times at Rajon's instigation. The hairpin bends are named after the winners of stages. All hairpins had been named by the 22nd climb in 2001 so naming restarted at the bottom with Lance Armstrong's name added to Coppi's.

Stage 18 of the 2013 Tour de France included a double ascent of the climb, reaching  on the first passage, and continuing to the traditional finish on the second.

Only one rider has won the Alpe stage while in yellow, Geraint Thomas in the second of two back to back Alpine stage wins in 2018. He also held on to win the overall Tour.

French journalist and L'Équipe sportswriter Jean-Paul Vespini wrote a book about Alpe d'Huez and its role in the Tour de France: The Tour Is Won on the Alpe: Alpe d'Huez and the Classic Battles of the Tour de France.

Spectators
The Alpe has chaotic crowds of spectators. In 1999, Giuseppe Guerini won despite being knocked off by a spectator who stepped into his path to take a photograph. The 2004 individual time trial became chaotic when fans pushed riders toward the top. Attendance figures on the mountain have to be treated with caution. A million spectators were claimed for 1997. Eric Muller, the mayor of Alpe d'Huez, however, said there were 350,000 in 2001, four years later despite acceptance that the number rises every year. "We expect more than 400,000 for the centenary race in 2003", he said. The author Tim Moore wrote:

As a variant on a sporting theme, Alpe d'Huez annoys the purists but enthrals the broader public, like 20/20 cricket or beach volleyball. Last year, a full-blown tent-stamping riot had required heavy police intervention. During this year's clean-up operation, down in a ravine with the bottle shards and dented emulsion tins, a body turned up. He'd fallen off the mountain and no one had noticed. When the Tour goes up Alpe d'Huez, it's a squalid, manic and sometimes lethal shambles, and that's just the way they like it. It's the Glastonbury Festival for cycling fans.

Alpe d'Huez has been nicknamed the "Dutch Mountain", since Dutchmen won eight of the first 14 finishes in le Tour De France. British author Geoffrey Nicholson wrote:

The attraction of opposites draws [Dutch spectators] from the Low Countries to the Alps each summer in any case. But all winter in the Netherlands coach companies offer two or three nights at Alpe d'Huez as a special feature of their alpine tours. And those Dutch families who don't come by coach, park their campers and pitch their tents along the narrow ledges beside the road like sea-birds nesting at St Kilda. The Dutch haven't adopted the Alpe d'Huez simply because it is sunny and agreeable, or even because the modern, funnel-shaped church, Notre Dame des Neiges, has a Dutch priest, Father Reuten (until a few years ago, it was used as a press room and was probably the only church in France where, for one day at least, there were ashtrays in the nave and a bar in the vestry, or where an organist was once asked to leave because he was disturbing the writers' concentration). No, what draws the Dutch to Alpe d'Huez is the remarkable run of success their riders have had there".

Significant stages
1952: Jean Robic attacked at the start of the climb and only Fausto Coppi could stay with him. The two climbed together until Coppi attacked at bend five,  from the top. He won the stage, the lead in the general classification, and kept it till the end of the race.

1977: Lucien Van Impe, a Belgian rider leading the climbers' competition, broke clear on the Col du Glandon. He gained enough time to threaten the leader, Bernard Thévenet. He was still clear on the Alpe when a car drove into him. The time that Van Impe lost waiting for another wheel may have been enough to cost him the Yellow Jersey, as Thévenet and Hennie Kuiper charged on to the finish with Thévenet remaining in the lead by eight seconds over Kuiper.

1978: Another Belgian leading the mountains race also came close to taking the yellow jersey as leader of the general classification. Michel Pollentier also finished alone, but he was caught soon afterwards defrauding a drugs control and was disqualified. Due to this disqualification Dutch rider Joop Zoetemelk, who finished 3rd on the stage and would have climbed to 2nd in the General Classification, took over the yellow jersey, but would lose it on the final time trial to Bernard Hinault. Zoetemelk has his name on two of the hairpin turns at Alp d'Huez being one of the select few riders to win this stage twice; once in 1976 and once in 1979.

1984: The Tour invited amateurs to take part in the 1980s. The best was Luis Herrera, who lived at  altitude in Colombia. None of the professionals could follow him. He won alone to the cacophony of broadcasters who had arrived to report his progress.

1986: Bernard Hinault said he would help Greg LeMond win the Tour but appeared to ride otherwise. The two crossed the line arm in arm in an apparent sign of truce creating a moment that has become one of the most iconic photographs in Tour history.

1997: Marco Pantani, who won on the Alpe two years earlier, attacked three times and only Jan Ullrich could match him. He lasted until  from the summit and Pantani rode on alone to win in what is often quoted as record speed (see below).

1999: Giuseppe Guerini, who broke away on his own, collided with a spectator but got up and went on to win the stage.

2001: Lance Armstrong feigned vulnerability earlier in the stage, appearing to be having an off-day. At the bottom of the Alpe d'Huez climb, Armstrong moved to the front of the lead group of riders and then looked back at Jan Ullrich. Armstrong later commented that he wasn't looking back at Ullrich but was actually looking back to see the position of his teammate Chechu Rubiera. Seeing no response from Ullrich, Armstrong accelerated away from the field to claim the victory, 1:59 ahead of Ullrich. Armstrong would later be stripped of this achievement and his tour win by his conviction for doping in 2012. His name however, is still honored on one of the 21 signs of previous winners, lining the hairpin turns of Alpe d'Huez.

2013: Christophe Riblon won the stage at the summit of Alpe d'Huez during the 100th edition of the Tour. For the first time ever, riders rode up the climb twice with the descent over the Col de Sarenne in between.

2018: Geraint Thomas, Tom Dumoulin, Chris Froome, Romain Bardet and Mikel Landa were able to catch Steven Kruijswijk, who had been on a 70 km solo attack, about 2/3 of the way up the climb and with about 500 meters to go Thomas dropped the remaining elite riders to become the first rider to win the Alpe d’Huez stage while wearing the yellow jersey.

2022: World cyclo-cross and Olympic mountain-bike champion Tom Pidcock, riding his first Tour, broke away on the Galibier descent, before going solo from a break including four-time Tour winner Chris Froome with around 8 km to go and won on the Alpe, the youngest winner on the Alpe in Tour de France history.

Winners

*In 1979 there were two stages at Alpe d'Huez.
† Stage 18 of the 2013 Tour climbed to Alpe d'Huez twice. Moreno Moser was the leader at the first time over the summit.

Fastest ascents

The climb has been timed since 1994 so earlier times are subject to discussion. Other times have been taken  from the summit, which is the start of the climb. Others have been taken from the junction  from the start.

These variations have led to a debate. Pantani's 37m 35s has been cited by Procycling and World Cycling Productions, publisher of Tour de France DVDs, and by Cycle Sport. In a biography of Pantani, Matt Rendell notes Pantani at: 1994 – 38m 0s; 1995 – 38m 4s; 1997 – 37m 35s.

Such sources list Pantani's time in 1995 as the record at 36m 40s. In Blazing Saddles, Rendell has changed his view and listed it as 36m 50s as does CyclingNews. Second, third, and fourth fastest are Pantani in 1997 (36m 55s), Pantani in 1994 (37m 15s) and Lance Armstrong in 2004 (37m 36s). Jan Ullrich's time in 1997 (37m 41s) makes him the fifth fastest, highlighting how the 1990s had faster ascents than other eras.

A number of cycling publications cite times prior to 1994, although distances are typically not included, making comparisons difficult. Coppi has been listed with 45m 22s for 1952.

In the 1980s Gert-Jan Theunisse, Pedro Delgado, Luis Herrera, and Laurent Fignon rode in times stated to be faster than Coppi's, but still not breaking 40m. Greg LeMond and Bernard Hinault have been reported as having the times of 48m 0s in 1986.

It was not until Gianni Bugno and Miguel Indurain in 1991, that times faster than 40m were reported, including in the 39m range for Bjarne Riis in 1995 and Richard Virenque in 1997.

Ascent times
Some times based on 14.454 km according to Matt Rendell's first book, other times based on 13.8 km.

* The 2004 stage was an individual time trial.

†Lance Armstrong, and Floyd Landis admitted to doping and had the Tour de France titles withdrawn. Jan Ullrich also admitted to doping and Virenque was implicated in what, at the time, was the biggest doping scandal in Tour history.

Based on 13.8 km

Other cycle races

Mountain biking
The resort caters for mountain bikers during the summer months, the pinnacle of which is the Megavalanche, a 'Downhill Enduro' Event that takes riders from lift station at the highest peak, Pic Blanc, to Allemont in the valley floor.

Triathlon
Since 2006 Cyrille Neveu has organized the Triathlon EDF Alpe d'Huez, which has become a major summer attraction.

Zwift 
In 2018, the virtual cycling training and racing program Zwift released a recreation of the Alpe d'Huez climb called Alpe du Zwift. This virtual version of the climb was created using GPS data from the original route to copy it perfectly in both gradient and distance.

International relations

Twin towns – Sister cities
Alpe d'Huez is twinned with:
  Bormio, Italy, since 2005.

See also
 List of highest paved roads in Europe
 List of mountain passes

References

External links

 Ski Resort Website (in French & English)
 Oz-en-Oisans info
 Map and details of 5 Cycling Routes up Alpe d'Huez (in English)
 Alpe d'Huez – Independent guide to Alpe d'Huez in English
 Google Map of Various Cycling Routes and Landmarks
 Alpe D'Huez Average Power Calculator
 Cycling up to Alpe d'Huez: data, profile, map, photos and description
 Snowcomparison
 Ski Resort Trail Map 
 Interview with historian Jean-Paul Vespini's book "The Tour Is Won On The Alpe" by Matt Wood

Venues of the 1968 Winter Olympics
Bobsleigh, luge, and skeleton tracks
Climbs in cycle racing in France
Geography of Isère
Olympic bobsleigh venues
Ski stations in France
Sports venues in Isère
Tourist attractions in Isère